Roman Paparyha (born 9 July 1999) is a Ukrainian professional footballer who plays for Neman Grodno.

References

External links 
 
 
 

1999 births
Living people
Sportspeople from Zakarpattia Oblast
Ukrainian footballers
Ukrainian expatriate footballers
Expatriate footballers in Hungary
Ukrainian expatriate sportspeople in Hungary
Expatriate footballers in Belarus
Ukrainian expatriate sportspeople in Belarus
Association football forwards
MFA Mukachevo players
FC Rukh Brest players
FC Energetik-BGU Minsk players
FC Neman Grodno players
Ukrainian Amateur Football Championship players
Belarusian Premier League players